The National Film Award for Best Feature Film is one of the categories in the National Film Awards presented annually by the Directorate of Film Festivals, the organisation set up by Ministry of Information and Broadcasting in India. It is one of several awards presented for feature films and awarded with the Golden Lotus (Swarna Kamal). The award is announced for films produced in a year across the country, in all Indian languages. , the award comprises a Swarna Kamal, a certificate, and a cash prize of  2,50,000 and is presented to the producer and the director of the film.

The National Film Awards were established in 1954 to "encourage production of the films of a high aesthetic and technical standard and educational and culture value" and also planned to include awards for regional films. The awards were instituted as "State Awards for Films" but were renamed to "National Film Awards" at the 15th National Film Awards in 1967. , the award is one of six Swarna Kamal awards presented for the feature films. The award winning film is included at the annual International Film Festival of India. Only the films made in any Indian language and silent films which are either shot on 35 mm, in a wider gauge, or digital format but released on a film or Video/Digital format and certified by the Central Board of Film Certification as a feature film or featurette are made eligible for the award.

The inaugural award was named as "President's Gold Medal for the All India Best Feature Film" and was awarded to Marathi film, Shyamchi Aai (Shyam's Mother), produced and directed by Pralhad Keshav Atre and is based on Pandurang Sadashiv Sane's Marathi novel of the same name. , sixty seven feature films have been awarded which are made in twelve different languages: Bengali (twenty-two), Hindi (fourteen), Malayalam (twelve), Kannada (six), Marathi (five), Tamil (three), Assamese, English, Gujarati and Sanskrit (two each), Beary and Telugu (one each). At the 26th National Film Awards (1978), no feature film was awarded with the Best Feature film award as the jury headed by filmmaker Chetan Anand scrutinised eighty films but did not consider any film to be "worthy of merit" and "measured up to the standard of excellence set forth by the jury". At the 59th National Film Awards, two feature films shared the award; Marathi film Deool (Temple) and Beary film Byari. Most recently, the award is presented to Tamil film Soorarai Pottru, directed by Sudha Kongara.

Satyajit Ray is the most honoured director where six of his filmsPather Panchali (1955), Apur Sansar (1959), Charulata (1964), Goopy Gyne Bagha Byne (1968), Seemabaddha (1971), and Agantuk (1991)won the award, followed Buddhadeb Dasgupta (five), Girish Kasaravalli and Mrinal Sen (four each), Shaji N. Karun (three), and Adoor Gopalakrishnan, Tapan Sinha, G. V. Iyer and Priyadarshan (two each). As of 2022, the award was presented to the films of Eleven debutant directors; Satyajit Ray (Pather Panchali, 1955), Adoor Gopalakrishnan (Swayamvaram, 1972), M. T. Vasudevan Nair (Nirmalyam, 1973), Girish Kasaravalli (Ghatashraddha, 1977), Shaji N Karun (Piravi, 1988), Sandeep Sawant (Shwaas, 2003), Salim Ahamed (Adaminte Makan Abu, 2010), Suveeran (Byari, 2011), Anand Gandhi (Ship of Theseus, 2013), Chaitanya Tamhane (Court, 2015), Abhishek Shah ( Hellaro 2018). Five films awarded with the Best Feature film award were also the Indian submission for the Academy Award for the Best Foreign Language Film; Apur Sansar (1959), Shwaas (2004), Adaminte Makan Abu (2011),  Court (2015) and Village Rockstars (2018) . Adi Shankaracharya (1983), the first film made in Sanskrit language, and Byari (2011), the first film made in Beary language, won the award at the 31st National Film Awards and 59th National Film Awards, respectively.

Awards 
Since its inception in 1953, the producer of the film is awarded with the gold medal and a certificate. A cash prize of  20,000 was introduced at the 5th National Film Awards (1957) and was revised to  40,000 at the 18th National Film Awards (1970), to  50,000 at the 28th National Film Awards (1980), to  2,50,000 at the 54th National Film Awards (2006).

From 1953 till 1956, the director of the film was awarded with the Gold medal which was later changed in 1957 to a cash prize of  5,000. From 1967 till 1973, a plaque was also awarded to the director and cash prize was revised to  10,000 in 1970. At the 22nd National Film Awards (1974), the award for the director was changed to Rajat Kamal (Silver Lotus) and a cash prize of  15,000 which was later revised to  20,000 at the 25th National Film Awards (1977). Since 28th National Film Awards (1980), the director is awarded with the Swarna Kamal and a cash prize of  25,000 which was later revised to  50,000 at the 28th National Film Awards (1980), to  2,50,000 at the 54th National Film Awards (2006).

In 1973 and 1974, the lead actor and actress of the film were also awarded. P. J. Antony and Sumithra received a souvenir for Malayalam film Nirmalyam at the 21st National Film Awards (1973). Antony was also awarded the Best Actor, then known as the "Bharat Award for the Best Actor". Utpal Dutt and Gita Sen were awarded with a medallion for Bengali Film Chorus at 22nd National Film Awards (1974).

Winners 
Films in the following languages have won the Best Feature Film award:

Explanatory notes

References

External links 
 of Directorate of Film Festivals, India

Film
Awards for best film